HD 10180 c is an exoplanet approximately 130 light-years away in the constellation Hydrus. It was discovered in 2010 using the radial velocity method. With a minimum mass comparable to that of Neptune, it is of the class of planets known as Hot Neptunes. Dynamical simulations suggest that if the mass gradient was any more than a factor of two, the system would not be stable.

While planet c does not exist in any mean motion resonances, both planets with adjacent orbits (b and d) share near resonances with c.

References

Exoplanets discovered in 2010
Exoplanets detected by radial velocity
Hydrus (constellation)
Hot Neptunes